Reece derives from the Welsh name Rhys. It may refer to:

 Recce (filmmaking)
 Reece (name), people with the given name or surname
 A-Reece (born 1997), South African rapper and record producer
 Reece, Kansas, United States
 Mount Reece, in the Antarctic Peninsula
 Reece Group, an Australian company

See also

 
 Recce (disambiguation)
 Rees (disambiguation)
 Reese (disambiguation)
 Reis (disambiguation)
 Rhees (disambiguation)
 Rhys, a surname